Born to Kill (also known as Django - nato per uccidere) is a 1967 Italian Spaghetti Western film written, directed and produced by Antonio Mollica, at his directorial debut. It stars Gordon Mitchell and Femi Benussi.

Plot

Cast  
 Gordon Mitchell as  Rod Gordon
 Femi Benussi as  Flory
 Aldo Berti as  Dudgett
 Franco Gulà as  John Storm
  Tom Felleghy as  Tyson
 Alfredo Rizzo as  Spieler 
  Giovanna Lenzi  as  Rose

References

External links 
 

Spaghetti Western films
1967 Western (genre) films
1967 films
1967 directorial debut films
1960s Italian films